Bertrand Croset (20 June 1941 – 7 February 2002) was a French bobsledder. He competed in the two-man and the four-man events at the 1968 Winter Olympics.

References

1941 births
2002 deaths
French male bobsledders
Olympic bobsledders of France
Bobsledders at the 1968 Winter Olympics
Sportspeople from Haute-Savoie